Joseph Vincent Rullo (June 16, 1916 – October 28, 1969) was a professional baseball player.  He was a second baseman over parts of two seasons (1943–44) with the Philadelphia Athletics.  For his career, he compiled a .212 batting average in 151 at-bats, with 11 runs batted in.

He was born in New York City and died in Philadelphia at the age of 53.

External links

1916 births
1969 deaths
Philadelphia Athletics players
Major League Baseball second basemen
Baseball players from New York (state)
Minor league baseball managers
Wilmington Blue Rocks (1940–1952) players
Lancaster Red Roses players
Milwaukee Brewers (minor league) players
Tulsa Oilers (baseball) players
Birmingham Barons players
Natchez Indians players
Greenville Bucks players
St. Hyacinthe A's players
Federalsburg A's players
Cordele A's players
Newport News Pilots players
Tarboro A's players